José Vega Santana, known by his stage name "Remi" (born February 28, 1958) is a singer and clown from Puerto Rico. His career as a clown, spanning over 35 years, began with the group "Los Dulces Payasos" ("The Sweet Clowns") after developing the character of Remi while a student at the Interamerican University of Puerto Rico. He's one of the most famed clowns in Puerto Rico.

Family life
Vega is married to Bettina Mercado, president of Bettina Cosmetics. He has a daughter from a previous marriage to Marina Berti, Marina Vega Berti who participated in Miss Universe Puerto Rico 2013 as Miss Luquillo.

Early years
Vega was born in San Juan, Puerto Rico, his mother was the lead singer in "Googie Santana" and his grandfather was former baseball player Pepe Santana. Ever since he was young, Vega knew that he wanted to be an entertainer. He started as a radio music programmer and announcer. Later, he joined the dance and theater company of María Teresa Miranda.

In the mid-1970s, Vega was a Psychology student in the Interamerican University of Puerto Rico. During that time he also took painting classes in the School of Plastic Arts in San Juan. It is there that he, together with some other students decided to form an "Artisans Market" at the Luis Muñoz Rivera Park. The purpose of the "Market" was to give painting classes to young children, and on one occasion they dressed up as clowns. This was when Vega developed and created the character of "Remi". They became so popular that they decided to form a group and call themselves Los Dulces Payasos (The Sweet Clowns).

Remi the clown

In 1983, Vega and the group received an offer from local T.V. producer Tommy Muñiz to work in "Channel 7". The channel gave them their own children's show. During this time they also recorded an album with songs composed by Vega. They have the distinction of being the first "cultural clowns" to create new children's songs in Puerto Rico.

During the time that Vega wasn't acting in his clown character, he sang and composed songs for the group Haciendo Punto en Otro Son. Vega composed "Mi Son", a song that summarized the band's journey from the first album until the last studio album Llegaremos. He participated in the group until the live album, Punto Final (1986). He also did a solo of one of his compositions called "Personajes".

In 1985, Vega developed a new concept in children's television, which he called Chiquimundo, and whose main objective was to educate children. This show was also transmitted on "Channel 7" and was produced by Rafo Muñiz (Tommy's son). "Remi" was joined by the clowns "Colorina" and "Cascabel". The show was an instant hit with the children and their parents in Puerto Rico.

In 1986, the three clowns recorded an album for children which became a local hit. Vega joined forces with the musician Pedro Rivera Toledo and produced the theater production of El Soldadito de Plomo (The Little Lead Soldier) in which Vega played the leading role.

Singing career
In the year 2000, Vega was selected to represent Puerto Rico in the international song festival known as the OTI which was celebrated in the city of Acapulco, Mexico. In the festival he sang one of his compositions Con Una Canción (With A Song) and won first place as "Best Singer". He also won a second place prize for "Best Composer". The last time a Puerto Rican had received a distinction in the "OTI" festival was in 1980, when Rafael José won as "Best Singer". Vega received a hero's welcome upon his return to the island and was honored by the Puerto Rico House of Representatives and Senate for his distinguished career of 20 years.

Later years
Vega has traveled to many cities in the United States making presentations as "Remi". He had a comic book which was called Remi, El Clown which presented the adventures of Puerto Rico's Clown, Remi.

See also

List of Puerto Ricans
List of Puerto Rican songwriters

References

External links
Haciendo Punto en Otro Son
Biografía del Payaso Remi José Vega Santana (Spanish)

1958 births
Living people
People from San Juan, Puerto Rico
Puerto Rican cartoonists
Puerto Rican comedians
20th-century Puerto Rican male singers
21st-century Puerto Rican male singers
Puerto Rican comics artists